The following is a partial list of the "G" codes for Medical Subject Headings (MeSH), as defined by the United States National Library of Medicine (NLM).

This list continues the information at List of MeSH codes (G09). Codes following these are found at List of MeSH codes (G11). For other MeSH codes, see List of MeSH codes.

The source for this content is the set of 2006 MeSH Trees from the NLM.

– digestive, oral, and skin physiology

– digestive physiology
  – appetite
  – appetite regulation
  – defecation
  – deglutition
  – digestion
  – drinking
  – eating
  – gallbladder emptying
  – gastrointestinal motility
  – gastric emptying
  – gastrointestinal transit
  – myoelectric complex, migrating
  – peristalsis
  – hunger
  – intestinal absorption
  – liver regeneration
  – mastication
  – postprandial period
  – salivation

– dental physiology
  – dental caries susceptibility
  – dental enamel solubility
  – dental occlusion
  – dentin solubility
  – tooth calcification
  – tooth eruption
  – tooth exfoliation
  – tooth migration
  – mesial movement of teeth
  – tooth mobility
  – tooth permeability
  – dental enamel permeability
  – dentin permeability
  – tooth resorption
  – root resorption

– skin physiology
  – galvanic skin response
  – hair color
  – piloerection
  – skin absorption
  – skin aging
  – skin pigmentation
  – skin temperature
  – sweating

The list continues at List of MeSH codes (G11).

G10